ROCAD Construction Limited is a construction company in Nigeria, a subsidiary of R&R Group. It is known for constructing some of Nigeria's infrastructure, roads and bridges.

History
ROCAD Construction Limited was incorporated 2002,the founding members Ronaldo Minaise and Roger Farajallah.

In December 2002, the company undertook its first construction project in Nigeria - the construction of the Kudaru Bridge linking Kano with Kaduna State.

Article Links 
ROCAD Using Volvo on Boqaata Dam Middle-east
Kundila flyover flags-off
Top 10 Construction Companies
Federal Press Briefing OWO Bridge
Project Award
Mining Concession
Boqaata Dam Lebanon one of the Biggest in the Middle-east
federal Projects 
Honurable Minister Flags off Flyover
Recommendations
Quality works at Kano
federal Ministry Of works
Kano State recommends
Rocad Boqaata RCC Dam in the Middle east
Construction Of the Kano Underpass the first in Northern Nigeria

External links
Official website
R&R Group

Construction and civil engineering companies established in 2002
Construction and civil engineering companies of Nigeria
Nigerian companies established in 2002